This is a list of the winners of the annual International Bible Contest (Hebrew: חידון התנ"ך).

Youth Winners

Adult Winners

Diaspora Winners

Notes

References

External links

List of youth winners

Lists of people by activity